Pigmented warts are a cutaneous condition commonly reported in Japan, most often occurring on the hands or feet.

See also 
 Skin lesion
 List of cutaneous conditions

References 

Virus-related cutaneous conditions